GNK Dinamo Zagreb Academy, also known as Hitrec-Kacian, are the youth team of Dinamo Zagreb. The academy was founded on 27 December 1967. There are a total of ten age categories within the academy, the oldest being the Junior Team (under-19) and youngest being the Zagići II Team (under-8). They have produced many of the Croatia national team stars including Luka Modrić, Vedran Ćorluka, Eduardo, Robert Prosinečki and Zvonimir Boban.

History
The first junior team was formed in 1945 and the coach was the famous Građanski Zagreb goalkeeper Maks Mihelčić. Soon after that, Márton Bukovi joined the youth squad as an expert coach, but left after two years following his disappointment with the disbanding of Građanski. The junior team won a treble in 1950 (Zagreb's, Croatian and Yugoslav championships) under the leadership of Mirko Kokotović.

In 1952 Branko Horvatek started training one of the best junior generations the club ever had. Some of the famous players that played in that generation were Dražan Jerković, Mladen Košćak, Marijan Kolonić and Mladen Klobučar. The decision to form the youth academy Hitrec-Kacian was brought on 27 December 1967 with Horvatek being elected as its first director. Apart from him, many other famous Croatian coaches worked with the generation that was very successful in the period of 1972-1974 in Yugoslav junior competitions. Some of them include: Zorislav Srebrić, Marko Jurić, Pero Dujmović, Vladimir Čonč, Ivan Đalma Marković, Mirko Belić, Rudolf Cvek and Zdenko Kobešćak.

Honours

Domestics

Croatian football league system
Croatian U-19 Prva HNL
 Winner (10): 2000, 2001, 2002, 2003, 2009, 2010, 2011, 2016, 2018, 2019
Croatian U-17 Prva HNL
 Winner (17): 1992, 1999, 2000, 2002, 2003, 2006, 2008, 2009, 2010, 2011, 2013, 2014, 2015, 2016, 2017, 2018, 2019
Croatian U-15 Prva HNL
 Winner (10): 1997, 1998, 2002, 2004, 2005, 2007, 2010, 2015, 2016, 2017 

Croatian Cup U-19
 Winner (7): 2000, 2001, 2003, 2004, 2008, 2012, 2013
Croatian Cup U-17
 Winner (4): 2014, 2015, 2016, 2017
Croatian Cup U-15
 Winner (3): 2015, 2016, 2018

Yugoslav football league system
Yugoslav Championship U-19
 Winner (5): 1950, 1955, 1972, 1973, 1974
Croatian Championship U-19
 Winner (17): 1950, 1951, 1954, 1955, 1963, 1966, 1967, 1968, 1972, 1973, 1974, 1976, 1979, 1980, 1983, 1984, 1986
Croatian Championship U-17
 Winner (2): 1959, 1985

Yugoslav Cup U-19
 Winner (2): 1967, 1973
Croatian Cup U-19
 Winner (5): 1963, 1967, 1968, 1973, 1978

Internationals

FIFA Youth Cup
 Winner (1): 2018
Manchester United Premier Cup
 Winner (1): 2012–13
Premier League International Cup
 Runners-up (1): 2018–19 
UEFA Youth League
 Quarterfinals (2): 2018–19, 2019–20 
Kvarnerska rivijera
 Winner (9): 1961, 1967, 1977, 1981, 1984, 1986, 1999, 2008, 2019
International Nereo Rocco Tournament
 Winner (2): 2002, 2009

Modern times
After the formation of HNL in 1991. Dinamo youth teams play important role with 6 U19 and  9 U17 titles (as of 2010). Since the mid-2000s Dinamo's youth academy is considered one of the best in Europe with their teams winning notable international tournaments. Some of the former Dinamo youth players include Croatian internationals Vedran Ćorluka, Luka Modrić, Eduardo da Silva, Niko Kranjčar, Dejan Lovren, Milan Badelj, Ivan Kelava, Mateo Kovačić and Šime Vrsaljko.

Notable academy graduates

 Milan Badelj
 Igor Bišćan
 Zvonimir Boban
 Tomislav Butina
 Vedran Ćorluka
 Eduardo
 Joško Gvardiol
 Alen Halilović
 Ivan Kelava
 Mateo Kovačić
 Andrej Kramarić
 Niko Kranjčar
 Jerko Leko
 Dejan Lovren
 Luka Modrić
 Robert Prosinečki
 Zvonimir Soldo
 Dario Šimić
 Šime Vrsaljko
 Dino Drpić

UEFA Youth League record

Players

GNK Dinamo Zagreb II

References

External links
Official website

1967 establishments in Croatia
Academy
Dinamo Zagreb
Premier League International Cup
UEFA Youth League teams